François Blanc (12 December 1806 – 27 July 1877), nicknamed "The Magician of Homburg" and "The Magician of Monte Carlo", was a French entrepreneur and operator of casinos, including the Monte Carlo Casino in Monaco.  His daughter, Marie-Félix, married Prince Roland Bonaparte.

Early life 
François was born on 12 December 1806 with his twin brother Louis. They grew up in a small town and were impressed every time circus came with a show - it seemed so interesting and simple so they followed the circus to learn all the tricks of the trade, boys were dreaming to become rich and successful and learnt so much and worked on different jobs.

Career

The brothers started to work in gambling business in Marseilles and earning some money brothers decided to develop their business and started to speculate on government pensions and got into real estate development.  In that way they attracted attention to their business and were arrested, but not for a long time because law was not adopted yet for such cases. They were released and moved to Paris, but after King Louis Philippe passed new laws they had to move again - to Luxembourg.  They ran profitable business there but it was just the first little step to their success in Hesse-Homburg near Frankfurt, where brothers signed a contract with a monarch because of debts of the city and in order to develop tourism industry.

One innovation was the introduction of the single 0 style roulette wheel in 1843. This allowed Bad Homburg to compete against the casinos of Paris which offered the traditional wheel with both single and double zero house pockets. A legend says that François Blanc supposedly bargained with the devil to obtain the secrets of roulette. The legend is based on the fact that the sum of all the numbers on the roulette wheel (from 0 to 36) is 666, which is the "Number of the Beast".

The venture was a great success, Homburg became popular in a moment with a lot of entertainment, gambling houses, hotels - all the richest and famous came there for new emotions and fun. In a while François Blanc was given the name "The Magician of Homburg".

Homburg could attract people only in summer months, during cold winter all the tourists preferred to rest in warmer places. It gave an idea to François to move to South and open all-year business.

It happened that the Prince of Monaco had recently legalized gambling, so "The Magician of Homburg" became that first person to establish a casino operation in  Monaco. To establish Monaco as a gambling mecca for the elite of Europe, he invested his money in roads, railways to make people come to Monaco as a new place of rest and fortune. His new King gave François a freedom, so he turned from "The Magician of Homburg" to "The Magician of Monte Carlo" and he left his mark in a history of Monaco.

Personal life

Blanc was twice married. His first wife was Madeleine-Victoire Huguelin (1823–1852).  Together, they were the parents of:

 Camille Blanc (1847–1927), who married Elisabeth Lanxade (b. 1852) in 1885.
 Charles Blanc (1848–1872), who died aged 24.

After the death of his first wife, he remarried to Marie Charlotte Hensel (1833–1881), with whom he had:

 Louise Blanc (1854–1911), who married Prince Constantine Wincenty Maria Radziwiłł (1850–1920), a grandson of Prince Antoni Radziwiłł and Princess Louise of Prussia.
 Edmond Blanc (1856–1920), who married Héloïse Marot (b. 1853) and Marthe Galinier (1874–1947).
 Marie-Félix Blanc (1859–1882), who married Prince Roland Bonaparte (1858–1924).

Blanc died in Loèche-les-Bains on 27 July 1877.

Descendants
Through his daughter Louise, he was the grandfather of Louise Adela Radziwiłł (1877–1942) (who married Armand de La Rochefoucauld, duc de Doudeauville, and was the mother of Marie de La Rochefoucauld (1901–1983), who married Henri-Antoine-Marie de Noailles, 11th Prince de Poix) and Prince Léon Radziwiłł, who married Princess Dolores Radziwiłł and Antonine de Gramont.

Through his daughter Marie-Félix, he was the grandfather of Princess Marie Bonaparte (1882–1962), who married Prince George of Greece and Denmark, the second son of George I of Greece and Olga Konstantinovna of Russia, and is remembered chiefly for having once saved the life of the future Emperor of Russia, Nicholas II in 1891 during their visit to Japan together.

References

External links

1806 births
1877 deaths
Burials at Père Lachaise Cemetery
Businesspeople in the casino industry
19th-century French businesspeople
Blanc family